Jason Koon (born August 14, 1985) is an American professional poker player from Weston, West Virginia known for his accomplishments in live and online poker tournaments.

Early life
Koon graduated from Lewis County High School in 2003 and then attended West Virginia Wesleyan College in Buckhannon. There he received his Masters in Business Administration and Finance. He declared he started to play poker following an injury. To avoid boredom, his roommate taught him Texas Hold'Em, and Jason Koon realized he could make a lot of money.

Poker career
Koon began playing poker in 2006 during college. He played online under the alias JAKoon1985 on PokerStars and NovaSky on Full Tilt Poker. In April 2009, he won a tournament in the Spring Championship of Online Poker earning over $300,000 prize money. Since 2008, Koon has participated in live tournaments.

Koon played in his first WSOP in 2009 where he cashed twice. In 2010, Koon finished 4th in the World Poker Tour main event at the Bellagio for $225,000.

In 2011, Koon chopped a Full Tilt Poker "FTOPS" event that had 11,343 runners for $458,550. 

In 2012, Koon played in the high roller event at the Bahamas EPT event earning over $270,000. At the 2012 WSOP Koon finish 2nd in the $3,000 No Limit Hold'em/Pot Limit Omaha - Heads-Up event earning $128,660.

In 2013, Koon finished runner up to David Peters in the $10,000 Bellagio Cup earning $316,000.

In 2015, Koon turned $100 into $110,820 after 18 hours of play finishing third in a low buy in event at the SCOOP.

In 2016, Koon won Seminole Hard Rock Poker Open for $1,000,000. He defeated Seth Davies in heads up.

Koon won a large pot off Doug Polk in the hybrid cash game on Poker After Dark.

Koon's most lucrative tournament win to date was in Triton Poker's 2018 Super High Roller Series Montenegro in Budva. In a short-deck ante-only tournament with a 1 million buy-in (127,000 at tournament time) and 103 entrants, he won 28,102,000 (3,579,914), defeating Xuan Tan in heads-up play.

In August 2019 He finished 2nd in the Event 3 of London Triton Poker Super High Roller Series (£50,000 No Limit Hold'em - 8 Handed) for £907,000.

As of January 2021, Koon's total live tournament earnings exceed $31,100,000. He has won 15 live titles and stands 10th in the world all-time money list.

On January 13, 2021, Koon made his debut on High Stakes Poker after filling the seat left empty by Jean-Robert Bellande in Episode 5 of Season 8. Koon bought in for $300,000 and the game was $400/$800 No-Limit Hold'em.

During the 2021 WSOP, Koon won Event #11, the $25,000 Heads-Up No-Limit Hold’em Championship for his first WSOP bracelet.

In October 2022, Koon won Event #10: $50,000 No-Limit Hold'em of the 2022 Poker Masters. Koon topped a 37-entrant field to win $666,000.

In December 2022, Koon faced off with Phil Hellmuth in Round 5 of High Stakes Duel 3. Koon defeated Hellmuth and won the $1,600,000 prize while advancing to Round 6 where he will await his next opponent.

In December 2022, Koon finished third overall on the 2022 PGT leaderboard with 2,833 PGT points. Koon was one of the 21-eligible players that were able to participate in the season-ending PGT Championship. Koon finished Day 1 as the overwhelming chip leader before winning the event after defeating Sean Winter heads-up for $500,000.

In January 2023, no challenger stepped up to take on Koon in Round 6 of High Stakes Duel 3, and he was declared the champion.

On February 18th 2023, Koon won the 3rd annual World Series of Art Poker in Los Angeles, CA. The unique artist based tournament is put on by Stussy, Casinola, and Wood Kusaka Studio every year coinciding with LA's art fair week. 

As of January 2023, Koon has cashed for over $42,300,000 in live poker tournaments.

Personal life
Koon became engaged to Bianca Armstrong after three years of dating. The couple first met while on the track and field team at West Virginia Wesleyan College. They married on October 26, 2019, at the Redwood Cathedral at Ventana Big Sur, California. They welcomed their first child in September 2021.

Sponsorships
In October 2017, Jason Koon was announced as a member of partypoker’s team pro. In August 2021, Koon left partypoker.

He also works as a coach on RunItOnce.

In October 2021 at the 2021 World Series of Poker, Koon was announced as a GGPoker Global Ambassador.

References

External links
 Jason Koon Hendon Mob profile

1985 births
American expatriates in Canada
American poker players
Living people
People from Weston, West Virginia
West Virginia Wesleyan College alumni